Waleed S. Al-Jasem Al-Mubarak (born 18 November 1959) is a Kuwaiti football defender who played for Kuwait in the 1982 FIFA World Cup. He also played for Kuwait SC.

References

External links
FIFA profile

1959 births
Kuwaiti footballers
Kuwait international footballers
Association football defenders
Kuwait SC players
Olympic footballers of Kuwait
Footballers at the 1980 Summer Olympics
1982 FIFA World Cup players
Living people
Asian Games medalists in football
Footballers at the 1982 Asian Games
Footballers at the 1986 Asian Games
1980 AFC Asian Cup players
1984 AFC Asian Cup players
1988 AFC Asian Cup players
AFC Asian Cup-winning players
Asian Games silver medalists for Kuwait
Asian Games bronze medalists for Kuwait
Medalists at the 1982 Asian Games
Medalists at the 1986 Asian Games
Kuwait Premier League players